Lievesley is a surname. Notable people with the surname include:

Denise Lievesley, British social statistician
Joe Lievesley (1883–1941), English footballer
Leslie Lievesley (1911–1949), English footballer and manager
Wilfred Lievesley (1902–1979), English footballer